The 25th Infantry Division was a military unit of the German Wehrmacht. It was later reclassified to 25th Infantry Division (mot.), and in June 1943 to the 25th Panzer Grenadier Division.

The 25th Panzergrenadier Division fought in the central sector of the Eastern front from June 1943 to July 1944. It was destroyed in the encirclement east of Minsk and reformed in October 1944. It then fought in Western Europe between October 1944 and January 1945 and in eastern Germany January to May 1945. Most of the survivors of the division surrendered to the western Allies.

History

Battle of France and Eastern Front 
The 25th Panzergrenadier Division was originally formed as an infantry unit, designated 25th Infantry Division and made up of Swabian and Bavarian personnel. It participated in the Polish Campaign and the Battle of France.

In late 1940, it was reorganized as the 25th motorized infantry division and took part in Operation Barbarossa, the invasion of the Soviet Union, in June 1941. It was attached to Army Group Center and fought in the Soviet Union for two years before being reorganized as the 25th Panzergrenadier Division in June 1943. After another year of heavy fighting, the division was almost destroyed near Minsk during the Soviet Operation Bagration in the summer of 1944; the survivors were reorganized at the training area at Mielau (in modern-day Poland) as the 107th Panzer Brigade.

Western Front (1944–1945) 
In September 1944, 107th Panzer Brigade participated in Operation Market Garden as part of LXXXVI Corps of the 1st Parachute Army. The Brigade had been re-routed from Aachen to Holland and went almost immediately into combat at Nuenen against the American 506th PIR of the 101st Airborne Division and the British 15th/19th The King's Royal Hussars of the 11th Armoured Division.

In November 1944, the brigade was upgraded back to divisional status at the Baumholder training area and re-numbered back as the 25th Panzergrenadier Division.

The new division moved to France in the area of the German / Luxembourg / French border at Sierck-les-Bains, where it fought a delaying action against the US Third Army, until December. It was then moved to Bitche. There it fought on the Maginot line fortifications at Forts Ouvrage Simserhof and Ouvrage Schiesseck, under the command of the XIII SS Corps and Obergruppenführer Max Simon.

After the US Seventh Army's offensive operations were halted in December as a result of the German Ardennes Offensive, the 25th was pulled out of the line and re-organized near Zweibrücken. It then took part in Operation Nordwind, along with the 21st Panzer Division. Together, these divisions were to exploit the penetrations made by either the XIII SS Corps in the west, or the LXXXIX and XC Corps in the east, with the intention of cutting the US Seventh Army off from the 1st French Army. It was then sent back to the eastern front to defend against the Soviet attack on the Oder north of Berlin, most of the survivors managed to escape to the west and surrendered to the British or Americans.

Commanders

 Generalleutnant Christian Hansen (6 October 1936 – 15 October 1939)
 Generalleutnant Erich-Heinrich Clößner (15 October 1939 – 15 January 1942)
 Generalmajor Sigfrid Henrici (15 January - 4 February 1942)
General der Infanterie, Anton Graßer (4 February 1942 – 5 November 1943)
Generalleutnant Dr. Fritz Benicke (5 November 1943 – 4 March 1944)
Generalleutnant Paul Schürmann (4 March 1944 – July 1944)
Generalleutnant Paul Schürmann (October 1944 – 10 February 1945)
Generalleutnant Arnold Burmeister (10 February 1945 – 8 May 1945)

Order of battle
Division Staff
25. Mapping Detachment (mot)
35. Panzergrenadier Regiment
Staff Company
Panzerjäger Platoon
Motorcycle Platoon
Signals Platoon
Pioneer Platoon
3 x Battalions
Battalion Staff
3 x Companies (mot)
Machine Gun Company (mot)
Infantry Gun Company
119. Panzergrenadier Regiment
Staff Company
Panzerjäger Platoon
Motorcycle Platoon
Signals Platoon
Pioneer Platoon
3 x Battalions
Battalion Staff
3 x Companies (mot)
Machine Gun Company (mot)
Infantry Gun Company
25. Panzer Reconnaissance Battalion
Battalion Staff
Light Armored Car Company
3 x Motorcycle Companies
Heavy Company (mot)
Pioneer Platoon
2 x Panzerjäger Platoons
Light Infantry Gun Section
125. Panzerjäger Battalion
3 x Panzerjäger Companies (self-propelled)
Flak Company (self-propelled)
8. Panzer Battalion
Staff Company
Flak Platoon
3 x Sturmgeschütz Batteries
Panzer Maintenance Platoon
25. Artillery Regiment
Staff Battery
3 x Battalions
Staff Battery (mot)
3 x Batteries (mot)
25. Pioneer Battalion
Battalion Staff
3 x Companies (mot)
Light Pioneer Column (mot)
25. Signals Battalion
Battalion Staff
Telephone Company (mot)
Radio Company (mot)
Signals Column (mot)
Supply and Support Units

In popular culture
The action at Nuenen by the 107th Panzer Brigade during Operation Market Garden is dramatized in episode 4 "Replacements" of the television series Band of Brothers.

References

 
 

25
Military units and formations established in 1943
Military units and formations disestablished in 1945